Ian David Campbell is an Australian-born opera singer, stage director, administrator, radio broadcaster and writer. He was the General Director and Artistic Director of San Diego Opera from 1983 until 2014. In the 1960s and 1970s he sang opera as a tenor, then moved into opera management.

In March 2014 he told the San Diego Opera's board of directors that the company should shut down, saying its finances made continued operation no longer viable. The board of directors concurred in a 33-1 vote. There had been no advance warning that he was about to propose this, and the decision was controversial. Two months later, under new board leadership, the decision to close was rescinded and his employment was terminated.

Early life and education
Campbell was born in Brisbane, grew up in Townsville, and graduated from the University of Sydney, holding the designations of Fellow, and Certified Professional Manager, from the Australian Institute of Management.

Opera career
He began his operatic career in 1967 as a principal character tenor with the Australian Opera (now known as Opera Australia), and retired from singing in 1974 following the first season in the Sydney Opera House. He moved into management as Senior Music Officer for the Australia Council from 1974 to 1976, and later became General Manager of the State Opera of South Australia in Adelaide from 1976 to 1982. In 1982 he joined the Metropolitan Opera in New York as Assistant Artistic Administrator before becoming the General and Artistic Director, CEO of San Diego Opera in 1983.

His stage directing credits include La bohème (1981) and The Tales of Hoffmann (1982) for the State Opera of South Australia; Cavalleria rusticana and Pagliacci for Santa Barbara Grand Opera (1999).  For San Diego Opera he has staged Falstaff (1999), Il trovatore (2000), Tosca (2002), Katya Kabanova (2004) with Patricia Racette, La traviata (2004) with Anja Harteros singing her first Violetta, La bohème (2005) with Richard Leech, and Don Quichotte (2009) with Ferruccio Furlanetto and Denyce Graves.  
 
Campbell is a past Chairman of Opera America. He was a Guest Professor of Music at San Diego State University in 1986, conducted annual master classes for singers at the Music Academy of the West in Santa Barbara for seven years, and chaired the judging panel for the Metropolitan Opera auditions in the Sydney Opera House in Australia in August 1989.

For 20 years Campbell produced and hosted programs on San Diego radio, and in 2003 his program “At the Opera with Ian Campbell” was awarded both First Place for a Radio Series, and Best of Show for Radio by the San Diego Press Club.

In March 2014 he proposed to the Board of Directors that San Diego Opera should be dissolved at the conclusion of its 2014 season in April, citing a decrease in attendance and in major donations. The opera's board of directors agreed by a 33-1 vote. The announcement came as a shock to the public, because the company has no debt and had given no public hint it was contemplating closure. Amid public criticism of the board and of Campbell personally, the closure deadline was extended several times, and numerous board members including the president resigned. The remaining board members chose a new president and placed Campbell on paid administrative leave, effective April 25, 2014. On May 15 it was announced that he would be leaving the company.  After a meeting of the board of directors on May 16, the board voted to rescind the decision to close and announced plans for a 2015 season consisting of three operas.

Recognition
He was the San Diego Press Club Headliner of the Year for the Arts in 1991, and in 1997 was chosen as one of the Fathers of the Year for San Diego. In 2004 he received The University of Sydney’s prestigious James Wolfensohn Award for “the betterment of society and his profession.”

Personal life
He married soprano Rachel Gettler in 1982 but they divorced in 1984. In 1985 he married Ann Spira, the San Diego Opera's director of strategic planning and projects; they divorced in 2012. From 1983 through 2014 they were the top and highest-paid administrators of San Diego Opera. He currently resides in the Mission Hills area of San Diego, and is the father of sons Benjamin and David.

References
Notes

Other sources
Bio, San Diego Opera on www.sdopera.com
An Interview with Ian Campbell, General Director, San Diego Opera, 10 February 2009, Opera Warhorses on  www.operawarhorses.com
Interview with Ian Campbell, part II, 21 February 2009, Opera Warhorses on www.operawarhorses.com

1945 births
Living people
20th-century Australian male opera singers
Opera managers
Classical music radio presenters
Fellows of the Australian Institute of Management